A View from the End of the World is the fourth album by Swedish metal band Machinae Supremacy, released on 3 November 2010.

Track listing

Official track listing released by the band:

"A View from the End of the World" – 3:52
"Force Feedback" – 5:34
"Rocket Dragon" – 4:51
"Persona" – 5:16
"Nova Prospekt" – 5:13
"World of Light" – 1:14
"Shinigami" – 4:08
"Cybergenesis" – 5:43
"Action Girl" – 4:12
"Crouching Camper Hidden Sniper" – 3:59
"Indiscriminate Murder is Counter-Productive" – 4:07
"One Day in the Universe" – 4:16
"The Greatest Show on Earth" – 3:31
"Remnant (March of the Undead IV)" – 5:54

References

2010 albums
Machinae Supremacy albums